Julia Channel (born 3 November 1973) is a French actress, singer, entrepreneur, and former pornographic actress.

Career
After posing for magazines such as Playboy and Penthouse in the early 1990s, Channel debuted in the adult industry in 1992 and retired in 1996; during this time, she starred in about 120 productions. In 1998, she won a Hot d'Or d'Honneur Award.

She also starred in a number of mainstream films, such as Les truffes alongside Jean Reno, Frères (1994), Coup de vice (1996) together with Samy Naceri, and Recto/Verso (1999). In addition, she starred in a series of erotic TV-movies produced and broadcast by M6 Television, and, in 2001, she hosted the TV-program Le journal du hard on Canal+.

Channel appeared in a number of hip hop music videos, including Method Man's "Judgement Day". She also hosted a music program, Hip Hop Channel, which was broadcast by the channel MCM. In 2010, she started her own musical career, releasing her first single "All I want" from her debut album Colours. In her 2012 music video for the song "Forever in a Day", she had as a guest star the soccer player Didier Drogba.

In 2008, Channel published an autobiography entitled L'enfer vu du ciel (The hell seen from the sky).

In 2010, she created a dating service website for singles called Mecacroquer.

Personal life
Channel was born to a Malian father and a French mother of Italian origin.

References

External links
 Personal web page
 
 Juan Caido, «Avec les Suisses, pas de dérapages», 20 Minutes, 15 November 2006
 
 Julia Channel on Myspace

Living people
1973 births
French female adult models
French television actresses
French film actresses
French pornographic film actresses
Actresses from Paris
Singers from Paris
20th-century French actresses
French people of Malian descent
French people of Italian descent
21st-century French singers
21st-century French women singers